Simon Mwansa Kapwepwe International Airport  is an international airport located in Ndola, Copperbelt Province, Zambia. It was officially known as Ndola Airport before being renamed in 2011 in honour of Simon Kapwepwe, the nation's former vice president. It is accessed by using the Dag Hammarskjöld Memorial Access Road off the T3 Road (Ndola-Kitwe Dual Carriageway).

The original Ndola Airport in Itawa was built to serve the city of Ndola, the administrative capital of the Copperbelt province. However as the relocated Simon Mawnsa Kapwepwe International Airport opened in 2021 it now serves the cities of Kitwe and Ndola in the Copperbelt, Zambia's 2nd and 3rd most populous cities. It additionally handles domestic, regional and international flights for both passengers and cargo.

In late 2021, the Simon Mwansa Kapwepwe International Airport moved its operations to its current location adjacent to the Dag Hammarskjöld Memorial from its previous location in Ndola's Itawa suburb. This new airport was engineered by the Aviation Industry Corporation of China (AVIC International) at a cost of $397 million. It was expected to be completed in Mid-2020 but was delayed by setbacks due to the COVID-19 pandemic.

History 
Before August 2021, the Simon Mwansa Kapwepwe International Airport was at an old location, in the Itawa suburb of Ndola (south-east of the city centre). Ndola's airport in Itawa officially became a civilian airport in the 1950s. Previously, it was known as Ndola Airport and in September 2011, President Michael Sata decided to rename the airport in honour of Simon Kapwepwe, the nation's former vice-president.

On 5 August 2021, Ndola's airport was officially moved from Itawa to a new address, 15 kilometres west of the city centre, just north of the Dag Hammarskjöld Crash Site Memorial, which is its current address. The airport's current location was known as the Copperbelt International Airport until construction finished in August 2021, when it was commissioned by President Edgar Lungu. At that point, it was renamed Simon Mwansa Kapwepwe International Airport, the name of the original airport. The new airport also retained the same IATA code (NLA).

The new airport was engineered by the Aviation Industry Corporation of China (AVIC International) at a cost of $397 million. It was expected to be completed in Mid-2020 but was delayed by setbacks due to the COVID-19 pandemic. On 05 August 2021, President Edgar Lungu commissioned the opening of the new airport, although it took about two more months for all operations to complete moving from the old airport to the new airport 15 kilometres west of the city centre.

As such, the old airport in the Itawa suburb is no-longer a commercial airport (no-longer named SMK International) and now belongs to the Zambian Air Force. On 30 July 2021, President Edgar Lungu gave the old airport location a name, Peter Zuze Air Force Base, named after Zambia's first indigenous air commander. Ndola remains having one commercial airport.

Location 
The airport is located adjacent to the Dag Hammarskjöld Crash Site Memorial and Ndola Girls Technical Secondary School in the western part of Ndola District. It is reachable, by road, using the Dag Hammarskjöld Memorial access road, off the Ndola-Kitwe Dual Carriageway. It is approximately 15 kilometres west of Ndola city centre by road.

Facilities 

Airlines and destinations 
The following airlines have scheduled passenger service at Ndola International airport:

Accidents and incidents 
 On 18 September 1961, a UN charter flight carrying United Nations Secretary General Dag Hammarskjöld crashed while en route to land at Ndola Airport in Itawa. Hammarskjöld and 15 others died in the crash. Although the cause of the crash has never been completely ascertained, it may have been caused by an aircraft attack. The crash site, 15 km west of the city centre (just south of the airport's current location), has been turned into the Dag Hammarskjöld Crash Site Memorial.
 On 4 April 2021, Ethiopian Airlines Flight 3981, a cargo flight operated by Boeing 737-800 ET-AYL, mistakenly landed at the as-yet unopened airport (Copperbelt International Airport) after a flight from Addis Ababa Bole International Airport. It should have landed at the nearby Simon Mwansa Kapwepwe International Airport in Itawa instead. The aircraft then took off from Copperbelt International and flew to the correct airport (Simon Mwansa Kapwepwe International). Two and a half hours later, a second Ethiopian Airways aircraft, Boeing 737-800 ET-AQP, also approached the as-yet unopened airport for a landing, but aborted in time and flew to the correct airport. It was reported that markings indicating the runway is closed were indistinct. Zambia's Transport Ministry opened an investigation into the incident.

See also 
 Transport in Zambia
 List of airports in Zambia

References

External links 
 
 
 

Airports in Zambia
Ndola
Copperbelt Province
Buildings and structures in Copperbelt Province
Tourist attractions in Copperbelt Province
Airports established in 2021